Millen is a surname. Notable people with the surname include:

 Ari Millen (born 1982), Canadian actor
 Corey Millen (born 1964), retired American ice hockey player 
 Edward Millen (1860–1923), Australian politician
 Floyd Millen (1919–1998), American politician from Iowa
 Greg Millen (born 1957), Canadian ice hockey player
 Karen Millen, fashion designer 
 Matt Millen (born 1958), American football player and executive
 Rhys Millen (born 1972), New Zealand rally and drifting driver
 Rod Millen (born 1951), New Zealand rally driver and vehicle designer
 Steve Millen (born 1953), New Zealand IMSA racing driver